From Here to Wherever is the debut studio album by Australian rock band, Cordrazine. The album debuted and peaked at number 9 on the ARIA charts.

The album was nominated for two ARIA Awards at the ARIA Music Awards of 1998.

The album was re-released on vinyl in August 2020.

Track listing
 "Clearlight" - 4:20
 "Red Bull" - 1:54
 "Memorial Drive" - 3:37
 "Your Kingdom Will Fall" - 2:58
 "I Never Cared Before" - 5:25
 "Crazy" - 4:37
 "Spain" - 4:45
 "Suddenly in Blue" - 3:43
 "Ever After" - 2:43
 "Untitled" - 5:50

Charts

Release history

References

1998 debut albums